South Side is an American sitcom created by Bashir Salahuddin and Diallo Riddle. Filmed and set in the Englewood area of Chicago, it follows two friends (portrayed by Sultan Salahuddin and Kareme Young) who recently graduated from community college and are seeking business success while working at a rent-to-own shop. The show premiered on Comedy Central on July 24, 2019. In August 2019, the series was renewed for a 10-episode second season. The series moved to HBO Max for its second season on November 11, 2021, making the series a "Max Original". The second season premiered on November 11, 2021. In February 2022, the series was renewed for a third season, which premiered on December 8, 2022. In February 2023, the series was cancelled after three seasons.

Premise
South Side centers on "a pair of newly minted community college graduates and small-time hustlers who are always cooking up some petty scheme from black market Viagra to street corner popcorn — with an eye toward upward mobility".

Cast

Main 
 Sultan Salahuddin as Simon James 
 Kareme Young as Kareme Odom
 Chandra Russell as Sergeant Turner
 Bashir Salahuddin as Officer Goodnight

Recurring 
 Lil Rel Howery as Terrence Bishop
 Zuri Salahuddin as Stacy
 Quincy Young as Quincy Odom
 Langston Kerman as Adam Bethune
 Diallo Riddle as Allen Gayle
 Nefetari Spencer as Keisha
 Will Miles as Jay-Mal
 Lanre Idewu as Greg the Marine
 Jelani Lofton as Teddy
 Edward Williams III as Travis
 Aaron J. Hart as Aaron
 Rashawn Nadine Scott as Kitty Goodnight
 Michael Brunlieb as Chase Novak
 Ronald L. Conner as Bluto
 Antoine McKay as Uncle Spike
 LaRoyce Hawkins as Michael "Shaw" Owens
 Cole Keriazakos as Josh Goodnight

Guest 
 Nathaniel "Earthquake" Stroman
 Jeff Tweedy
 LisaRaye McCoy
 Kel Mitchell
 Ed Lover
 Deon Cole (season 2)
 Chance the Rapper (seasons 2, 3)
 Vic Mensa (seasons 2, 3)
 Dreezy (season 2)
 Sommore (season 2)
 Rhymefest (season 2)
 Furly Mac as Sensei Terry (season 2)
 Cordae (season 3)
 Donell Jones (season 3)
 Adele Givens (season 3)

Episodes

Series overview

Season 1 (2019)

Season 2 (2021)

Season 3 (2022)

Production

Development

On October 17, 2017, it was announced that Comedy Central had ordered the pilot for South Side from creators Bashir Salahuddin and Diallo Riddle, writing alums from Late Night with Jimmy Fallon. The two also serve as executive producers and co-stars. On May 16, 2019, it was announced that the series would premiere on July 24, 2019.

Showrunners Salahuddin and Riddle stated that South Side was created to portray the South Side of Chicago where Bashir Salahuddin grew up and to show that "[t]here is joy on the South Side and the many Chicagoans who made this show, both in front of and behind the camera, are eager to share that joy." The show is set in Englewood and features local actors and production members from Chicago.

Casting
Sultan Salahuddin, cast in the lead role of Simon, is the brother of show creator Bashir Salahuddin. Bashir plays Officer Goodnight opposite his real-life wife, Chandra Russell, who portrays Sergeant Turner. Sultan's co-lead, Kareme Young, is the real-life twin brother of cast member Quincy Young, who also plays his brother on the show. Other cast members and guest stars include Chicago natives Lil Rel Howery, Nathaniel "Earthquake" Stroman, LisaRaye McCoy, Chance the Rapper, and Kel Mitchell.

Release 
South Side premiered on July 24, 2019. On August 28, 2019, Comedy Central renewed the series for a 10-episode second season.  On August 13, 2020, it was reported that the series' first season was set to be streaming on HBO Max in 2021 and the series moved to HBO Max in November 2021, making the series a "Max Original". The second season was released on November 11, 2021. On February 8, 2022, HBO Max renewed the series for a third season. On February 21, 2023, HBO Max cancelled the series after three seasons.

Reception
South Side received positive critical reception. The first season of the show has a score of 79/100 on review aggregator Metacritic, indicating "generally favorable reviews." Writing for Vanity Fair, Laura Bradley stated: "The writers worked to imbue the series with a diverse cast of characters whose values, socioeconomic status, and ambitions varied widely...the thing all of the show's main characters have in common is their drive." Tambay Obenson wrote in a review for IndieWire, "The creators and cast know this world intimately, and instead of turning their camera on the usual crime and poverty, they find the humor that exists within the mayhem."

Season 2 holds a 100% on review aggregator Rotten Tomatoes based on six critics' reviews.

Awards and nominations

Other media 
On September 4, 2019, Comedy Central and WBEZ Chicago launched South Side Stories, a podcast collaboration that centers the real-life people and places that inspired the series.

References

External links

2010s American black sitcoms
2019 American television series debuts
2020s American black sitcoms
2022 American television series endings
African-American television
Comedy Central original programming
English-language television shows
HBO Max original programming
Television shows set in Chicago